Alexondra Lee (born February 8, 1975) is an American actress, dancer and producer. She is a television producer of such shows as A&E's Marcia Clark Investigates, Jo Frost: Nanny on Tour and Alien Highway, and History Channel's Legend of The Superstition Mountains.

She was born in Pennsylvania to parents Mae and Harry Lee. Lee studied ballet at age four and began dancing with the New York City Ballet at age seven; she performed with the latter in The Nutcracker Suite.

She starred in the short-lived Special Unit 2 as Detective Kate Benson and had a regular role as Callie on Party of Five. In 2006, Lee appeared as one of five corpses recounting the tales of their death on a CSI: Crime Scene Investigation episode entitled "Toe Tags".

Lee was ranked No. 81 on Stuff Magazine's 101 "Most Beautiful Women in The World" in 2001. She had a role in Paranormal Activity 4 as Holly Nelson. She was married to actor Stephen Dunham until his death in September 2012. She worked with him in his last film, Paranormal Activity 4.

Selected filmography

References

External links

1975 births
Actresses from Pennsylvania
American television actresses
Living people
21st-century American women